Hyderabad Metro Rail Brand Ambassadors (HMR–BA) campaign is an initiative of the Corporate Communication department of L&T Metro Rail (Hyderabad) Limited (LTMRHL) to find flag bearers for Hyderabad Metro Rail. There will be a citywide talent search where the brand ambassadors will be chosen based on the results of competitions.

Concept 
The initiative will select citizens of Hyderabad who wish to be a brand ambassador, in the category of companies (private, public or others), institutions (schools and colleges) and individuals such as senior citizens and housewives. The search is a multiple rounds competition that tests the individual's aptitude as an ambassador.

Functions of an ambassador
Brand ambassadors duties will include:
 Launching stations,
 Flagging off trains,
 Conducting forums and workshops on metro related subjects,
 Interacting with people on the HMR subject,

Ambassador qualities 
 Personality
 Communication skills
 Mental ability
 Leadership skills

Categories
The campaign is split across six categories, in two phases:

Phase 1:	
 Students (school)
 Students (college)
 Executives

Phase 2:
 Senior citizens
 Housewives
 Others

Timeline

Launch 
The campaign was launched on 8 January 2013 at a press conference attended by 200 press personnel and headed by V.B Gadgil, chief executive and managing director of LTMRHL, and Sanjay Kapoor, head of corporate communications.

V.B Gadgil said "Hyderabad Metro Rail Ambassadors campaign, conceptualised and promoted by LTMRHL is a unique initiative for the common man to avail the opportunity of becoming the Hyderabad Metro Rail – Brand Ambassador – A Celebrity".

Reach 
The advertising activities began after the press conference. The advertising campaigns are conducted through:
 Hoardings – from 8 January 2013 across key points in the city,
 Newspaper advertisements – from 9 January 2013 on leading newspapers,
 Radio broadcasts –  from 11 January 2013 on leading radio channels.
 Visits to educational institutes.

Partners 
The Hyderabad Metro Rail Brand Ambassadors campaign is backed by:
 Prasads IMAX as the promotion partner
 AECOM as a Diamond Sponsor,
 United India Insurance as the Gold Sponsor
 Parsons Brinckerhoff as the gifts sponsor,
 TV5 and Zee 24 Gantalu as the campaign partners
 Annapurna Studios as the official venue partner
 Rachnoutsav Events Pvt Ltd as the official event partners,

References 
  Metro Rail hunt for brand ambassadors The Hindu 1 February 2013
  http://www.hyderabadmetrorail.in The Hindu 9 February 2013
  L&T Metro to promote use of bicycles for commuting  the hindu businessline 17 February 2013
  Hyderabad students to be face of Hyderabad Metro Rail deccan chronicle 28 Jan 2013
  Want To Become Hyderabad Metro Rail Ambassador? 99mag on 9 January 2013
  Hyderabad Metro Rail Brand Ambassadors Campaign PRLog (Press Release) – 7 Feb 2013
  Hyderabad Metro Rail likely to run in mid-2015 New Indian express 9 January 2013
  Hyderabad Metro Rail emblem launched webindia123 Tuesday, 8 Jan 2013
  Hyderabad Students Become Brand Ambassadors indiabells.com 28 January 2013
  Hunt for Hyderabad Metro Rail brand ambassadors begins the hans India
  Hyderabad Metro Rail hunt for brand ambassadors pubmemo 9 February 2013
 Brand Ambassadors for Hyderabad Metro Rail, HMRhyderabad citymetrorail 4 February 2013

External links 
 

Transport in Hyderabad, India
Advertising in India